The gens Caeparia was a Roman family during the late Republic.  It is best known from two individuals: Marcus Caeparius of Tarracina, one of the conspirators of Catiline, who was supposed to induce the people of rural Apulia to revolt, in 63 BC; and another Marcus Caeparius, mentioned by Cicero in 46 BC.

Origin 
The Nomen Caeparius is Latin for "a trader in onions"

See also
 List of Roman gentes

References

Roman gentes